Nileshwar railway station (code: NLE) is a major railway station serving the town of Nileshwar in the Kasaragod District of Kerala. It lies in the Shoranur–Mangalore section of the Southern Railways. The station has two platforms and six tracks. Trains halting at the station connect the town to prominent cities in India such as Thiruvananthapuram, Kochi, Chennai, Kollam, Kozhikode, Coimbatore, Mangalore, New Delhi, Nagercoil, Bangalore  and so forth.

References

External links

Railway stations in Kasaragod district